The Ngaralda (Ngaralta), also known as Meru or Brabirawilung (though this last may be confusion with Brabralung), were an indigenous Australian people of South Australia.

Country
Their western confines were at Bremer Creek, Palmer, and as far as the eastern scarp of the Mount Lofty Ranges. Their boundary with the Jarildekald was at Pitjaringgarang (Mason Rock) on the eastern bank of the Murray.

Alternative names
 Ngaraltu
 Wanaulun
 Wanjakalde. (Jarildekald exonyms)
 Wanyakalde
 Wunyakalde
 Wanakald

Notes

Citations

Sources

Aboriginal peoples of South Australia